Suzanne Marie Matson (born 1959) is an American fiction writer, poet and professor at Boston College.

Education and career
Matson has a B.A. from Portland State University, and an M.A.(1983) and Ph.D. (1987) from the University of Washington. As of 2022, she is a professor at Boston College.

Work 
Matson is known for writing short fiction, novels and poetry. Her novels include The Hunger Moon, A Trick of Nature, The Tree-Sitter, and Ultraviolet. Her books of poetry have been reviewed by the Harvard Book Review.

Selected publications

Honors and awards 
In 2012 Matson received a National Endowment for the Arts Creative Writing Fellowship.

References

External links

Living people
American women poets
Portland State University alumni
University of Washington alumni
Boston College faculty
1959 births
20th-century American poets
20th-century American women writers
20th-century American novelists
20th-century American short story writers
21st-century American poets
21st-century American novelists
21st-century American short story writers
21st-century American women writers
American women novelists
American women short story writers